The 2014 Weber State Wildcats football team represented Weber State University in the 2014 NCAA Division I FCS football season. The Wildcats were led by first year head coach Jay Hill, played their games at Stewart Stadium and were members of the Big Sky Conference. They finished the season 2–10, 2–6 in Big Sky play to finish in a three-way tie for tenth place.

Schedule

Despite also being a member of the Big Sky Conference, the game with Sacramento State on September 13 is considered a non conference game and will have no effect on the Big Sky Standings.

Game summaries

Arizona State

Referee was Steven Strimling.

References

Weber State
Weber State Wildcats football seasons
Weber State Wildcats football